Miloš Govedarica (born 15 May 1964) is a Yugoslav wrestler. He competed in the men's Greco-Roman 100 kg at the 1992 Summer Olympics.

References

1964 births
Living people
Yugoslav male sport wrestlers
Olympic wrestlers as Independent Olympic Participants
Wrestlers at the 1992 Summer Olympics
Place of birth missing (living people)